Saint Brynoth of Skara (died 6 February 1317) was a medieval Swedish bishop who was canonized in 1498. His feast day is 9 May.

Life

The Book of Saints of the Monks of Ramsgate says only that he was "A Swede, Bishop of Scara in West Gothland, who passed away Feb 6, 1317, and is honoured in Sweden as a Saint." According to the hagiographer Alban Butler (1821),

Notes

Sources

 
 

Saints
1317 deaths